The Research, Innovation, and Dissemination Center for Neuromathematics (RIDC NeuroMat, or simply NeuroMat) is a Brazilian research center established in 2013 at the University of São Paulo that is dedicated to integrating mathematical modeling and theoretical neuroscience. Among the core missions of NeuroMat are the creation of a new mathematical system to understanding neural data and the development of neuroscientific open-source computational tools, keeping an active role under the context of open knowledge, open science and scientific dissemination. The research center is headed by Antonio Galves, from USP's Institute of Mathematics and Statistics, and is funded by the São Paulo Research Foundation (FAPESP). As of 2019, the co-principal investigators are Oswaldo Baffa Filho (USP), Pablo A. Ferrari (USP/UBA), Fernando da Paixão (UNICAMP), Antonio Carlos Roque (USP), Jorge Stolfi (UNICAMP), and Cláudia D. Vargas (UFRJ).  Ernst W. Hamburger (USP) was the former director of scientific dissemination.  NeuroMat's International Advisory Board consists of David R. Brillinger (UC Berkeley), Leonardo G. Cohen (NIH), Markus Diesmann (Jülich), Francesco Guerra (La Sapienza), Wojciech Szpankowski (Purdue).

Research 
NeuroMat has been involved in the development of what has been called the Galves-Löcherbach model, a model with intrinsic stochasticity for biological neural nets, in which the probability of a future spike depends on the evolution of the complete system since the last spike.[1] This model of spiking neurons was developed by mathematicians Antonio Galves and Eva Löcherbach. In the first article on the model, in 2013, they called it a model of a "system with interacting stochastic chains with memory of variable length.

See also 
Among the current large-scale international brain initiatives:
Allen Institute – from the USA
AusBrain – from Australia
BRAIN Initiative – from the USA
BRAINN - Brazilian Institute of Neuroscience and Neurotechnology – from Brazil
Brain/MINDS – from Japan
China Brain – from China
Human Brain Project – from Europe
IBT – Israel
Korea Brain Research Institute – from the Republic of Korea

References

External links

Official website
NeuroMat on Pesquisa FAPESP magazine

Research institutes in Brazil
Research institutes established in 2013
Neuroscience research centers in Brazil
Applied mathematics
University of São Paulo